Morgan Township is one of the twenty-seven townships of Ashtabula County, Ohio, United States. The 2010 census found 2,170 people in the township.

Geography
Located in the western part of the county, it borders the following townships:
Austinburg Township - north
Jefferson Township - northeast corner
Lenox Township - east
New Lyme Township - southeast corner
Rome Township - south
Hartsgrove Township - southwest corner
Trumbull Township - west
Harpersfield Township - northwest corner

Two villages are located in Morgan Township: part of Roaming Shores in the southeast, and Rock Creek in the center.

Name and history
Named for Connecticut landowner John Morgan, it is one of six Morgan Townships statewide.

The first Euro-American settler in Morgan Township was Nathan Gillett, who came from Connecticut in 1801.

Government
The township is governed by a three-member board of trustees, who are elected in November of odd-numbered years to a four-year term beginning on the following January 1. Two are elected in the year after the presidential election and one is elected in the year before it. There is also an elected township fiscal officer, who serves a four-year term beginning on April 1 of the year after the election, which is held in November of the year before the presidential election. Vacancies in the fiscal officership or on the board of trustees are filled by the remaining trustees.  Currently, the board is composed of chairman Bob Martin and members Mike Jones, David Larosa and Fiscal Officer Marie Lesko Silbaugh.

References

External links
County website

Townships in Ashtabula County, Ohio
Townships in Ohio